The Port of Melbourne Authority PMA was formed in 1958 under the Port of Melbourne Authority Act, taking over the role of the Melbourne Harbor Trust, although the name did not formerly change until 1978. It moved from its Market Street head office to the World Trade Centre (Melbourne) in 1983, a building which had been constructed by the PMA on port land. Subsequent restructuring in 1997 saw the Melbourne Port Corporation take over the PMA property and assets, while the Victorian Channels Authority gained berthing responsibilities, and the Melbourne Port Services was privatised and put out to tender. The Port of Melbourne Corporation was formed on 1 July 2003, taking over the  Melbourne Port Corporation, and the Victorian Channels Authority.

The PMA published the Port of Melbourne Quarterly, ISSN 0048-4865 later Title Port Panorama ISSN 0814-9089 which combined with the Port Gazette ISSN 0815-6085.

References

1958 establishments in Australia
Port authorities in Australia
Port of Melbourne